Enäjärvi is a lake in Finland. It is located in the municipality of Vihti in Uusimaa region. The lake is part of Sjundeå å basin that drains into the Gulf of Finland.

In Finland there are also four other lakes with the name Enäjärvi.

See also
List of lakes in Finland

References
 Finnish Environment Institute: Lakes in Finland

Lakes of Vihti